Siphosethu Lindinkosi Ngcobo is a South African politician who has been serving as the Secretary-General of the Inkatha Freedom Party since August 2019. He was elected to the National Assembly of South Africa in May 2019. Ngcobo is a former president of the National Teachers Union (NATU).

Education
Ngcobo holds a bachelor of education degree and a bachelor of arts degree.

Political career
Ngcobo is a long-standing member of the Inkatha Freedom Party. He was a branch chairperson, a constituency chairperson and a regional chairperson. In August 2019, he was elected secretary-general of the party, succeeding Velenkosini Hlabisa. Ngcobo was also the mayor of Ulundi.

Until September 2018, Ngcobo served as the president of the  National Teachers Union. He was succeeded by Allen Thompson.

Parliamentary career
In the 2019 election, Ngcobo was elected to the National Assembly of South Africa via the IFP's regional list. He was sworn in on 22 May 2019. On 27 June 2019, he was given his committee assignments.

Committee assignments
Portfolio Committee on Basic Education
Portfolio Committee on Higher Education, Science and Technology

References

Living people
Year of birth missing (living people)
Zulu people
People from KwaZulu-Natal
Inkatha Freedom Party politicians
Members of the National Assembly of South Africa
21st-century South African politicians